The Lumbocostal ligament is a fibrous band that crosses from the twelfth rib to the tips of the transverse processes of the first and second lumbar vertebrae. 

Thorax (human anatomy)
Ligaments